Paternoster is a surname. Notable people with the surname include:
 Angelo Paternoster (1919–2012), American football guard
 Fernando Paternoster (1903–1967), Argentine footballer and manager
 Henri Paternóster (1908–2007), Belgian fencer
 Henry Paternoster (1882–1956), Australian rules footballer
 Jim Paternoster (1875–1954), Australian rules footballer
 Letizia Paternoster (born 1999), Italian cyclist
 Marissa Paternoster (born 1986), American musician
 Matt Paternoster (1880–1962), Australian rules footballer
 Paola Paternoster (1935–2018), Italian retired athlete
 Raymond Paternoster (1952–2017), American criminologist
 Richard Paternoster (1802–1892), English civil servant
 Roger Paternoster (born 1934), Belgian field hockey player
 Ron Paternoster (1916–2002), Australian rules footballer
 Verusca Paternoster (born 1972), Italian softball player
 Vito Paternoster (21st century), Italian cellist